The 1907–08 season was the 35th season of competitive football in Scotland and the 18th season of the Scottish Football League.  This season also saw the first playing of the Scottish Consolation Cup.

League competitions

Scottish League Division One

Celtic won the title ahead of Falkirk and Rangers. A 1–0 win at Rangers' home Ibrox in an Old Firm match on 25 April 1908 meant that they could not be caught by either pursuer. In the close season, the Celtic goalscorer Alec Bennett switched to Rangers, one of very few player moves directly between the rivals.

Champions: Celtic

Scottish League Division Two

Other honours

Cup honours

National

County

Non-league honours

Senior

Highland League

Other Leagues

Scotland national team

Scotland were joint winners of the 1908 British Home Championship with England.

Key:
 (H) = Home match
 (A) = Away match
 BHC = British Home Championship

Other national teams

Scottish League XI

Notes

See also
1907–08 Aberdeen F.C. season

References

External links
Scottish Football Historical Archive

 
Seasons in Scottish football